ABC 10 may refer to one of the following American Broadcasting Company-affiliated television stations in the United States:

Current affiliates
 KAKE in Wichita, Kansas 
 KGTV in San Diego, California
 KTEN-DT3 in Ada, Oklahoma
 KXTV in Sacramento, California
 WALB-DT2 in Albany, Georgia
 WBUP in Ishpeming, Michigan
 WDIO-DT in Duluth, Minnesota
 WPLG in Miami, Florida
 WTEN in Albany, New York

Formerly affiliated
 KOVT in Silver City, New Mexico (1987 to 2012; now defunct)
Was a re-broadcast of KOAT-TV in Albuquerque
 KRBB-TV/KTVE in 	El Dorado, Arkansas / Monroe, Louisiana (1955 to 1981)
 WTSP in St. Petersburg, Florida (1965 to 1994)